The Parapanca is a small left tributary of the river Danube in Romania. It discharges into the Danube in Slobozia.

References

Rivers of Romania
Rivers of Giurgiu County